Ocrelizumab, sold under the brand name Ocrevus, is a medication used for the treatment of multiple sclerosis (MS). It is a humanized anti-CD20 monoclonal antibody. It targets CD20 marker on B lymphocytes and hence is an immunosuppressive drug. Ocrelizumab binds to an epitope that overlaps with the epitope to which rituximab binds.

It was approved by the US Food and Drug Administration (FDA) in March 2017, and the first FDA approved drug for the primary progressive form of MS; it was discovered and developed and is marketed by Hoffmann–La Roche's subsidiary Genentech under the trade name Ocrevus. With the approval, the FDA also required the company to conduct several Phase IV clinical trials to better understand whether the drug is safe and effective in young people, cancer risks, and effects on pregnant women and children they might bear.

The US Food and Drug Administration (FDA) considers it to be a first-in-class medication.

Medical uses
In the US, ocrelizumab is indicated for the treatment of relapsing forms of multiple sclerosis (MS), to include clinically isolated syndrome, relapsing-remitting disease, and active secondary progressive disease, in adults or for the treatment of primary progressive MS, in adults. It is administered by intravenous infusion.

In the EU, ocrelizumab is indicated for the treatment of adults with relapsing forms of multiple sclerosis (RMS) with active disease defined by clinical or imaging features and for the treatment of adults with early primary progressive multiple sclerosis (PPMS) in terms of disease duration and level of disability, and with imaging features characteristic of inflammatory activity.

Contraindications
Ocrelizumab should not be used in people with hepatitis B infection or a history of severe reaction to this drug.  If someone has an infection or infectious disease, treatment should be delayed until the infection is resolved.   It has not been tested in pregnant women, but based on animal studies does not appear to be safe for pregnant women to take; it is excreted in breast milk, and effects on infants are unknown.

Adverse effects 
As of October 2016 the three Phase III clinical trials of ocrelizumab used to obtain approval had not been published. Based on published data from clinical trials at that time, the most common adverse events were infusion reactions including itchy skin, rash, hives, flushing, throat and mouth irritation, fever, fatigue, nausea, rapid heart beating, headache, and dizziness.  One person died from a systemic inflammatory response syndrome and in another trial, rates of cancer were three times higher (2.3% vs. 0.8%) in people taking the drug than people taking placebo.  Clinical trials in rheumatoid arthritis and lupus were halted because rates of serious infections were too high; these results were not seen in published trials in people with MS, and the differences may be due to the differences in the bodies of people with the different diseases, as well as other drugs they were taking.

There is an increased risk of infections of all kinds, including respiratory infections, in people taking immunosuppressive drugs like ocrelizumab. In clinical trials submitted to the FDA, more people taking ocrelizumab got infections than people taking Interferon beta-1a did, including upper and lower respiratory infections, herpes, and hepatitis B reactivation. The risk of progressive multifocal leukoencephalopathy, a disease caused by viral infection of the brain, is also increased.

An increased risk of malignancy with ocrelizumab may exist. In controlled trials, malignancies, including breast
cancer, occurred more frequently in ocrelizumab-treated patients. Breast cancer occurred in 6 of 781 females 
treated with ocrelizumab for MS in clinical trials. None of 668 females treated in Rebif (interferon beta-1a) or placebo arms of the clinical trials developed breast cancer. Patients should follow standard breast cancer screening guidelines.

Pharmacology
Ocrelizumab is an immunosuppresive drug; it binds to CD20, which is selectively made and membrane expressed by B cells. When ocrelizumab binds to CD20 on B cells, these cells are deleted by antibody-dependent cell-mediated cytotoxicity and, to a lesser extent, complement-dependent cytotoxicity.

Chemistry 
Ocrelizumab is a humanized monoclonal antibody that binds to a CD20 epitope that overlaps partially with the epitope to which rituximab binds. It has an immunoglobulin G1 with a variable region against human CD20, with a human-mouse monoclonal 2H7 γ1-chain, bound via disulfide links with human-mouse monoclonal 2H7 κ-chain in a dimer.

History
A study of rituximab in MS with strong results, published in The New England Journal of Medicine in 2008, drove interest in B-cell depletion as a strategy to treat MS and has led to extensive off-label use of rituximab to treat primary and relapsing MS. Rituximab is a mouse protein, and is immunogenic in humans, and Genentech and its parent Roche decided to focus on the similar, but humanized mAb that they already had, ocrelizumab, for MS instead.

Clinical trials in people with rheumatoid arthritis and lupus were halted in 2010 because people with these conditions developed too many opportunistic infections when taking ocrelizumab. It was also studied in hematological cancer.

In MS, phase II results were announced in October 2010, and in October 2015, Genentech presented interim results of three Phase III clinical trials. In February, 2016 the FDA granted Breakthrough Therapy Designation for primary progressive multiple sclerosis.

On March 28, 2017, the FDA approved ocrelizumab for relapsing-remitting and primary-progressive multiple sclerosis. It is the first FDA-approved treatment for the primary progressive form. When the FDA approved the drug, it required Roche to conduct several Phase IV clinical trials, including: a two-part study in people between ten and 17 years old with relapsing multiple sclerosis to determine dosing, then safety and efficacy in these people, required to be completed by 2024; a prospective five-year study to better understand the risk of cancer, required to be completed by 2030; a prospective study creating a registry of women with MS exposed to ocrelizumab before and during pregnancy, women with MS not exposed to ocrelizumab, and women without MS, to understand the effect on women and children they might bear, due by 2029; an additional pregnancy outcomes study due by 2024; and an additional non-human primate study on fetal development and outcomes due by 2019.

The efficacy of ocrelizumab for the treatment of relapsing forms of MS was shown in two clinical trials in 1,656 participants treated for 96 weeks. Both studies compared ocrelizumab to another MS drug, Rebif (interferon beta-1a). In both studies, the patients receiving ocrelizumab had reduced relapse rates and reduced worsening of disability compared to Rebif. The trials were conducted in the US, Canada, Europe, Latin America, Africa and Australia.

In a study of PPMS in 732 participants treated for at least 120 weeks, those receiving ocrelizumab showed a longer time to the worsening of disability compared to placebo. The study was conducted in the US, Canada and Europe.

The application for ocrelizumab was granted breakthrough therapy, fast track, and priority review designations. The FDA granted approval of Ocrevus to Genentech, Inc.

Ocrelizumab was approved for use in the European Union in January 2018.

References

External links
 

Breakthrough therapy
Monoclonal antibodies
Genentech brands
Hoffmann-La Roche brands